Ömeroğlu is a village in the Polateli District, Kilis Province, Turkey. The village had a population of 215 in 2022.

References

Villages in Polateli District